Mark Cooksey (born 18 January 1966 in Skegness, Lincolnshire, England) is a British video game musician, best known for his work on the Commodore 64, most notably composing the music for the platform game Ghosts'n Goblins.  He was employed by the UK video game developer and publisher Elite Systems.

Since the demise of the Commodore 64, Mark has produced music for the Game Boy (including the Color and the Advance), the PC, the SNES and the PlayStation. His Game Boy Color work includes the music and sound effects for the 2001 Commander Keen game.

References 

1966 births
Living people
Commodore 64 music
Video game composers
People from Skegness